Yehezkel Hen (born 1882, died 4 April 1952) was an Israeli politician who served as a member of the Knesset for Mapai between 1951 and 1952.

Biography
Born in Boryslav in Austria-Hungary (today in Ukraine), Hen received a religious education, before studying at a Teachers' Seminary in Kiev. He taught Hebrew in Jewish schools until they were shut down by the Yevsektsiya. He made aliyah to Mandatory Palestine in 1925, where he worked as a teacher and a supervisor for the Histadrut's educational institutions. He also taught at the Levinsky Teachers Seminary in Tel Aviv.

Between 1944 and 1948 he was a member of the Assembly of Representatives for Mapai, and in 1951 he was elected to the Knesset on the Mapai list. However, he died on 4 April the following year whilst still an MK. His seat was taken by Rachel Tzabari.

References

External links

1882 births
1952 deaths
People from Boryslav
Ukrainian Jews
Polish emigrants to Israel
Ukrainian emigrants to Israel
Jews in Mandatory Palestine
Mapai politicians
Members of the Assembly of Representatives (Mandatory Palestine)
Israeli educators
Members of the 2nd Knesset (1951–1955)
Burials at Nahalat Yitzhak Cemetery